is the 11th single from the Japanese idol group Idoling!!!. It reached number 6 on the Oricon weekly chart and sold 17,098 copies in the first week.

Contents 
"S.O.W. Sense of Wonder" was released in three types:
 Limited Edition (CD and DVD)
 FAIRY TAIL Edition (CD and DVD)
 Normal Edition (CD only)
The FAIRY TAIL edition features Lucy Heartfilia, Natsu Dragneel, Happy, and Plue on the cover. Limited and Normal editions feature Idoling!!! members wearing costumes inspired by Lucy Heartfilia's costume on the FAIRY TAIL edition cover.

Track listing

CD

DVD

Limited Edition 
 S.O.W. Sense of Wonder music video
 Making-of S.O.W. Sense of Wonder music video

FAIRY TAIL Edition 
 S.O.W. Sense of Wonder music video
 Credit-less Fairy Tail opening video

Notes 
 "S.O.W. Sense of Wonder" was used as an opening song in the anime Fairy Tail from episode 12 until episode 24.
 "Don't be afraid" was used as ending theme song for Fuji TV's reality show "Kiseki Taiken! Unbelievable" from January - March 2010.
 Idoling!!! covered a TRF song "EZ DO DANCE" which was rearranged by Hibino Hirofumi. This cover song used most of the musical arrangement from  "Kishuhen Ecstacy".

References

External links 
 S.O.W. Sense of Wonder on iTunes Japan
 Idoling!!! official site - Fuji TV
 Idoling!!! official site - Pony Canyon
 Idoling!!! official Niconico Channel

2010 singles
Idoling!!! songs
Fairy Tail
2010 songs
Pony Canyon singles